Rodnaya is a rural locality (a village) in Pogorelovskoye Rural Settlement, Totemsky District, Vologda Oblast, Russia. The population was 104 as of 2002.

Geography 
Rodnaya is located 56 km southwest of Totma (the district's administrative centre) by road. Manylovitsa is the nearest rural locality.

References 

Rural localities in Tarnogsky District